Ferdy or Ferdie is a given name, often a diminutive of the masculine given name Ferdinand. It may refer to:

People
 Ferdy Sambo (born 1973), Indonesian former police general
 Ferdie Aston (1871–1926), English-born South African rugby union player
 Ferdie Bergh (1906–1973), South African rugby union player
 Ferdy Mayne, German actor born Ferdinand Philip Mayer-Horckel (1916-1998)
 Ferdie Pacheco (born 1927), former personal physician and cornerman for Muhammad Ali and other boxing champions and TV analyst
 Ferdinand de Rothschild (1839–1898), French-born British banker, art collector and politician
 Ferdie Schupp (1891–1971), American Major League Baseball pitcher

Fictional characters
 Ferdy Factual, aka "Nerdy Ferdy", a supporting character in the Berenstain Bears children's book series
 Ferdie Fieldmouse, Mickey Mouse's nephew
 Ferda Mravenec, a Czech literary and comics character, translated as Ferdy/Ferdi outside the Czech Republic and Slovakia
 Ferdy Fox, in Rupert Bear, a children's comic strip
 Ferdy the Frog, in The Slow Norris, a British children's television programme

Masculine given names
Hypocorisms